Emile Mosseri (born 11 August 1985) is an American composer, pianist, singer and producer based in Los Angeles. He has scored films including The Last Black Man in San Francisco (2019), Minari (2020), and Kajillionaire (2020), and composed for TV shows like HBO's Random Acts of Flyness and Season 2 of Amazon's Homecoming. He received an Academy Award nomination for Best Original Score for his work in Minari. Mosseri is a member of the indie-rock band The Dig, as well as a recording artist and touring musician. He studied film scoring at Berklee College of Music. He is the younger brother of Adam Mosseri.

Filmography

References

External links
 
 

1985 births
Living people
American film score composers
American people of Egyptian-Jewish descent
Berklee College of Music alumni
American male film score composers